Thomas Howard Toms (born October 15, 1951) is an American former professional baseball player. He was a relief pitcher who played from  through  in Major League Baseball. He was born in Charlottesville, Virginia, and attended East Carolina University.

Toms played with the San Francisco Giants in parts of three seasons. He posted a 0–3 record with a 5.40 earned run average and one save in 11 relief appearances, allowing 20 runs (14 earned) on 33 hits and nine walks while striking out five in 23⅓ innings of work.

Though he never won a game at the major league level, Toms did pick up one career save. It came on September 7, 1976 where Toms retired the final 2 batters of the game to nail down a 6-3 Giants victory over the Braves.

Toms also pitched six seasons in the minor leagues (1973–1978) and went 31–20 with a 3.08 ERA in 261 games.

Sources

1951 births
Living people
Amarillo Giants players
Baseball players from Virginia
Fresno Giants players
Great Falls Giants players
Major League Baseball pitchers
Sportspeople from Charlottesville, Virginia
Phoenix Giants players
Rochester Red Wings players
San Francisco Giants players
Springfield Redbirds players
Tucson Toros players